"Tellin' Everybody" is a song by Australian group Human Nature.  It was released as the second single from the debut studio album Telling Everybody. The song peaked at No. 30 in Australia and No. 82 in Germany.

Track listing
CD single (663615 1)
 "Tellin' Everybody" - 4:02
 "Party (Feels So Fine)" - 4:52

CD maxi (663266 2)
 "Tellin' Everybody" - 4:02
 "Party (Feels So Fine)" - 4:52
 "Tellin' Everybody (On the Floor)" - 6:07

Charts

Weekly charts
"Tellin' Everybody" debuted at No. 32 in Australia before rising to a peak of No. 31.

External links

References

Human Nature (band) songs
1996 songs
1996 singles
Sony Music Australia singles
Songs written by Paul Begaud
Songs written by Andrew Tierney
Songs written by Michael Tierney (musician)